Joseph Damer may refer to:
 Joseph Damer, 1st Earl of Dorchester (1718–1798), landowner
Joseph Damer (1676–1737), MP for Dorchester